Markeen Apartments is located in the Near Southside of Fort Worth, Texas.  The apartments sit on two lots at the northwest corner of Daggett and St. Louis avenues. The two-building complex was constructed in 1910 and designed in the Prairie School Style.  It was built by Charles W. Forbes.  The complex was purchased in 1999 and renovated.  It was listed on the National Register of Historic Places on May 2, 2001.

See also

National Register of Historic Places listings in Tarrant County, Texas

References

External links

National Register of Historic Places in Fort Worth, Texas
Residential buildings completed in 1936
S. H. Kress & Co.